The Pleasant Grove School at 65 South 100 East in Pleasant Grove, Utah was built in 1861.  It was listed on the National Register of Historic Places in 1980.

It was designed by English-born Henry Greenhalgh with an arched ceiling that provided good acoustics, and was built by mason William H. Adams, Sr., and carpenter William Paul.

References

School buildings on the National Register of Historic Places in Utah
School buildings completed in 1861
Buildings and structures in Pleasant Grove, Utah
Schools in Utah
1861 establishments in Utah Territory
National Register of Historic Places in Utah County, Utah
Individually listed contributing properties to historic districts on the National Register in Utah